Abdulkadir Ahmed Said is a prominent Somali film director, producer, screenwriter, cinematographer and editor.

Biography
Said was born in 1953 in Mogadishu, the capital of Somalia. In 1970, he began working for the Somali Film Agency as a photographer assigned to international relations and as a consultant for productions with other countries. Between 1984 and 1986, he served as Director of Programming on Somali television, and wrote and directed several training programs. Said also worked as assistant director on numerous film productions, including The Somali Dervish (1983); The Parching Winds of Somalia (1984); Riviera Somalia (1984), a program for the Italian public service broadcaster Radio Televisione Italiana (RAI); and A Man of Race (1987), produced by the LuceSaimon Film Institute.

While he has worked on many films in the past, Said is probably best known for his short films Geedka nolosha (The Tree of Life), which won the Prize of the City of Torino in the Best Film - International Short Film Competition category at the Torino International Festival of Young Cinema in 1988,  and La Conchiglia from 1992. In these two standout films, he artistically casts humans as the primary agents responsible for the destruction and depletion of the environment and its resources.

Notes

References

External links
 

Ethnic Somali people
1953 births
Living people
People from Mogadishu
Somalian film directors